Sipra Mallick is an Indian politician. She was elected to the Odisha Legislative Assembly as a member of the Biju Janata Dal.

References

Living people
Biju Janata Dal politicians
Janata Dal politicians
Women in Odisha politics
Odisha MLAs 2009–2014
1961 births
21st-century Indian women politicians